Seyed Khandan is a locality of the city of Tehran in Iran. It is the junction of Shariati Street and Resalat Highway, near the Resalat district.

History
Years ago, there was a cheerful man named "Seyyed" short for Seyyed Hossein Niavarani who ran a coffee shop ("Ghahveh Khaneh" in Persian) just north of where the Seyyed Khandan bridge is now located. In those days, Shariati Street was called the Old Road ("Jaddeh Ghadim" in Persian (جاده قدیم)). This street connected the center to the north of Tehran (Shemiranat). At the time, there were no automobiles traveling at high speed, and passing through Old Road was often time-consuming, so travelers usually stopped to rest along the way ( travellers included Mohammad Reza Shah). Seyyed's coffee shop was convenient, because it was almost in the center of Old Road. The area was named Seyyed Khandan after the cheerful coffee shop owner.

Neighbourhoods in Tehran